is the first cover album and second mini-album released by Japanese soloist misono. It charted on Oricon at No. 28 and remained on the charts for four weeks. The album was released on the same day as her fourteenth single, Urusei Yatsura no Theme: Lum no Love Song/Me.

The album was released solely as a CD, although a music video for the first song, "misono to Utaou! Animedley I", was placed on the aforementioned single.

For the album, misono covered a variety of songs from other artists, including Avril Lavinge's "Complicated", Mayo Okamoto's "Tomorrow" and Personz's "Dear Friends".

Information
Cover Album is the first cover album released by Japanese singer-songwriter misono on September 23, 2009. The album peaked at No. 28 on the Oricon Albums Charts, remaining on the charts for four consecutive weeks. The album was released the same day as her single Urusei Yatsura no Theme ~Lum no Love Song~／「Mii」, of which the a-side was also a cover song.

While the album was only released on a standard CD, the first track, "misono to Utaou! Animedley I" (misonoと歌おう!アニメドレーI / Sing with misono! Animedley I), was given a music video on the CD+DVD version of Urusei Yatsura no Theme: Lum no Love Song/Me.

misono had her own version of Mayo Okamoto's "Tomorrow" on her single Lovely♡Cat's Eye, which was released three years earlier in November 2006. Her rendition of "Complicated" had been used on the Avril Lavigne tribute album Tribute to Avril Lavigne -Master's Collection- (2006), in which various Japanese artists covered several songs by the Canadian artist.

misono's sister, Koda Kumi, would later cover some of the same songs, including Ouyang Fei Fei's "Love Is Over" (ラヴ・イズ・オーヴァー) on her Eternity ~Love & Songs~ album (2010), and Linda Yamamoto's "Dou ni mo tomaranai" on her Color the Cover album (2013).

Track listing

Charts (Japan)

References

External links
Misono's Official Website

2009 compilation albums
Covers albums
Misono albums
Avex Group compilation albums